The MidFlorida Credit Union Amphitheatre (originally Ford Amphitheatre and formerly 1-800-ASK-GARY Amphitheatre and Live Nation Amphitheatre) is an outdoor amphitheatre in East Lake-Orient Park, Florida. The venue is located on the Florida State Fairgrounds, adjacent to Interstate 4, in the eastern side of town.

MidFlorida Credit Union Amphitheatre has a capacity of approximately 20,000 (9,900 reserved seats and 10,000 on the lawn).

About the venue
Originally named the Ford Amphitheatre, when opened by Christian artists Michael W. Smith, David Crowder and headliner Mercy Me on July 23, 2004. It was renamed the 1-800-ASK-GARY Amphitheatre when the naming rights were purchased by the lawyer referral service for 2010 to 2012. The name change was not well received. In an online poll accompanying an article on the subject in the St. Petersburg Times, 95% of people responded with either "I hate it" or "I think it's pretty lame". At the beginning of 2013, it was announced Live Nation chose not the renew the naming rights for the facility. For the first five months of 2013, the venue was known as the Live Nation Amphitheatre. On May 15, 2013, MidFlorida Credit Union, a Florida-based financial institution acquired the naming rights for three years.

The amphitheater has played host to many music festivals. On the first Sunday of every December, it hosts 97X's Next Big Thing, an all day rock festival, mainly featuring alternative rock bands.

Bands that perform there must obey a decibel limit, due to noise complaints from residents that live close to the venue. A wall was erected in an attempt to help shield the noise.

Events

See also
List of contemporary amphitheatres
Live Nation

References

External links
Official website

Landmarks in Tampa, Florida
Music venues in Florida
Tourist attractions in Tampa, Florida
Theatres in Tampa, Florida
Music of Tampa, Florida
2004 establishments in Florida
Florida State Fair
Event venues established in 2004